The Katarniaghat Wildlife Sanctuary is a protected area in the Upper Gangetic plain, near Bahraich city in Bahraich district of Uttar Pradesh, India and covers an area of  in the Terai of the Bahraich district. In 1987, it was brought under the purview of the ‘Project Tiger’, and together with the Kishanpur Wildlife Sanctuary and the Dudhwa National Park it forms the Dudhwa Tiger Reserve. It was established in 1975.

The Katerniaghat Forest provides strategic connectivity between tiger habitats of Dudhwa and Kishanpur in India and the Bardia National Park in Nepal.
Its fragile Terai ecosystem comprises a mosaic of sal and teak forests, lush grasslands, numerous swamps and wetlands. It is home to a number of endangered species including gharial, tiger, rhino, Gangetic dolphin, swamp deer, hispid hare, Bengal florican, the white-backed and long-billed vultures.
In 2012, a rare red coral kukri snake was sighted in the sanctuary. This snake with the scientific name Oligodon kheriensis was first described from the North Kheri Division in 1936.

References

External links

Wildlife sanctuaries in Uttar Pradesh
Bahraich district
1975 establishments in Uttar Pradesh
Protected areas established in 1975